Bluebird Nordic, formerly Bluebird Cargo, is a cargo airline based in Reykjavík, Iceland, operating scheduled and chartered cargo services to and from Iceland and within Europe out of its base at Keflavík International Airport, with a special focus on Liège Airport & East Midlands Airport as freight hub.

History 
Bluebird Cargo was established in 1999 and started operations in March 2001. It was founded by a group of Icelandic individuals with a strong background in aviation and air cargo. Operations began with daily freighter services between Iceland, United Kingdom and Germany with a single Boeing 737-300F. It was wholly owned by Icelandair Group until 2010 and  had 63 employees.

In 2014, the airline was bought by Haru Holding and Steinn Logi Björnsson became CEO.

In 2017, the company changed their name from Bluebird Cargo to Bluebird Nordic

In January 2020, Avia Solutions Group acquired 100% of Bluebird Nordic.

In August 2021, Bluebird Nordic announced plans to increase its B737-800 fleet to 25 units by 2024.

On 4 January 2022, Bluebird Nordic acquired a Boeing 777-300ER which was formerly operated by Emirates. On 25 January 2022, Bluebird Nordic acquired another Boeing 777-300ER which was formerly operated by Cathay Pacific. In April 2022, Bluebird Nordic appointed Audrone Keinyte as new CEO.

Destinations 
, Bluebird Nordic operates freight services to the following scheduled destinations in addition to ad-hoc and charter services:

Reykjavík – Keflavík International Airport, base

Dublin – Dublin Airport

Billund - Billund Airport

Fleet

Current fleet 
The Bluebird Nordic fleet consists of the following aircraft:

Former fleet 
9 Boeing 737-300F

References

External links

Official website

Airlines of Iceland
Cargo airlines
Airlines established in 2000
Icelandair
2000 establishments in Iceland